Lactofree is a brand of lactose free dairy products, which is aimed at individuals with lactose intolerance. The brand was launched by Arla Foods UK in January 2006, and is available in the United Kingdom. Lactofree began licensing its lactose removing patent to other producers, in September 2010. Up to September 2010, Lactofree had seen growth by 37% year on year.  As of July 2021, Lactofree is worth 70.8% of the UK’s lactose free milk market.

References

External links 
 Lactofree

Arla Foods
Companies based in Leeds
Food brands of the United Kingdom
Dairy products companies
Dairy products companies of the United Kingdom